Licaria cubensis is a species of plant in the family Lauraceae. It is endemic to Cuba.

References

Flora of Cuba
Lauraceae
Vulnerable plants
Taxonomy articles created by Polbot